Ojecunca (possibly from Aymara uqi brown, grey brown, kunka throat, Quechua uqi  lead-colored, lead, kunka throat, "brown (or lead-colored) throat") is a mountain in the Vilcanota mountain range in the Andes of Peru, about  high. It is located in the Cusco Region, Canchis Province, in the districts of Checacupe and San Pablo. Ojecunca lies southwest of Jampatune and Pomanota. The Pumanuta River, an important tributary of the Vilcanota River, flows along its southern slope.

References

Mountains of Cusco Region
Mountains of Peru